Wissen is a Verbandsgemeinde ("collective municipality") in the district of Altenkirchen, in Rhineland-Palatinate, Germany. The seat of the Verbandsgemeinde is in Wissen.

The Verbandsgemeinde Wissen consists of the following 6 Ortsgemeinden ("local municipalities"):

* seat of the Verbandsgemeinde

References

Verbandsgemeinde in Rhineland-Palatinate